Frédéric Duvallès (1884–1971) was a French film actor. He was often simply credited as Duvallès.

Selected filmography
 The Wonderful Day (1932)
 Companion Wanted (1932)
 Dora Nelson (1935)
 The King (1936)
 Excursion Train (1936)
 Tricoche and Cacolet (1938)
 Folie douce (1951)
 His Father's Portrait (1953)
 When Do You Commit Suicide? (1953)
 Elena and Her Men (1956)
 Love in Jamaica (1957)
 Neither Seen Nor Recognized  (1958)
 The Burning Court (1962)

References

Bibliography
 Hayward, Susan. French Costume Drama of the 1950s: Fashioning Politics in Film. Intellect Books, 2010.

External links
 

1884 births
1971 deaths
French male film actors
French male stage actors
Male actors from Paris
20th-century French male actors